Unincorporated communities lacking elected municipal officers and boundaries with legal status, but are not classified as Census-designated places (CDPs).

See also
List of cities and towns in Alabama
List of census-designated places in Alabama

References

Alabama

Unincorporated